Charles Cooper Francis (1884–1956) was a cathedral organist, who served at Peterborough Cathedral.

Background

Charles Cooper Francis was born on 20 December 1884 in Peterborough.

He was an articled pupil of Haydn Keeton at Peterborough Cathedral.

Career

Assistant Organist of:
Peterborough Cathedral 1905 - 1910

Organist of:
St. Mark's Church, Harrogate 1910 - 1914
St. Mary's Church, Peterborough 1914 - 1920
Peterborough Cathedral 1944 - 1946

References

English classical organists
British male organists
Cathedral organists
1884 births
1956 deaths
20th-century organists
20th-century British male musicians
20th-century classical musicians
Male classical organists